A thoracic limb is a limb attached to the thorax.  It may refer to one of these topics:

 Upper limb, in human anatomy
 Forelimb, in animal anatomy
Arthropod limb, in insect anatomy

See also
 Pelvic limb (disambiguation)